Marie Ferranti, real name Marie-Dominique Mariotti (born 1962, in Lento, Haute-Corse), is a French writer. She chose the patronym of her maternal great-grandmother as a literary pseudonym.

Her novel La Princesse de Mantoue won the Grand prix du roman de l'Académie française. She was discovered by Pascal Quignard at éditions Gallimard.

She lives and works in the town of Saint-Florent, in the Haute-Corse.

Works 
1995: Les Femmes de San Stefano, novel, (crowned by the Académie française)
1996: La Chambre des défunts, novel
2000: La Fuite aux Agriates, novel
2002: La Princesse de Mantoue, novel, Grand prix du roman de l'Académie française
2002: Le Paradoxe de l'ordre, essai sur l'œuvre romanesque de Michel Mohrt
2004: La Chasse de nuit, novel
2006: Lucie de Syracuse, novel
2006: La Cadillac des Montadori, novel
2012: Une haine de Corse. Histoire véridique de Napoléon Bonaparte et de Charles-André Pozzo di Borgo, Grand Prix du Mémorial de la ville d'Ajaccio
2013: Marguerite et les grenouilles. Saint Florent, chroniques, portraits et autres histoires, récits
2014: Les Maîtres de chant, narration

External links 
 Entretien avec Marie Ferranti - Marguerite et les grenouilles on La Cause Littéraire
 Marie Ferranti présente "Les maîtres de chant" on Corse net.infos
 Marie Ferranti raconte une haine de Corse on Corse-Matin (27 March 2012)
 Marie Ferranti on the site of éditions Gallimard
 La Cadillac des Montadori on Babelio
 Les maîtres de chant par Marie Ferranti on Babelio

1962 births
Living people
People from Corsica
20th-century French novelists
21st-century French novelists
21st-century French essayists
20th-century French women writers
Grand Prix du roman de l'Académie française winners
French women novelists
21st-century French women writers
20th-century pseudonymous writers
Pseudonymous women writers